Henry Tutwiler Wright (born 1943) is an American archeologist and educator. Wright has had significant contributions to the field of archaeology through his fieldwork, publications, and teaching. He serves as the Albert Clanton Spaulding Distinguished University Professor of Anthropology in the Department of Anthropology, and Curator of Near Eastern Archaeology in the Museum of Anthropology at the University of Michigan. He is also an External Professor at the Santa Fe Institute and a member of the Santa Fe Institute's Science Board.

Biography 
Henry T. Wright was born March 29, 1943 in Annapolis, Maryland. His mother was Anne St. Clair Wright, an Annapolis historical preservationist. He earned a B.A. degree from the University of Michigan (1964), and a Ph.D. degree in Near Eastern archaeology from University of Chicago (1967).

Wright has conducted fieldwork in Egypt, Iran, Iraq, Kenya, Madagascar, eastern North America and the American Midwest. From 1968 until 1978, he researched Mesopotamia in Iran.

Awards
 2009 – Gold Medal for Distinguished Archaeological Achievement, Archaeological Institute of America (AIA)
1994 – Elected Fellow, National Academy of Sciences
1993 – MacArthur Fellows Program

Publications
"Agent Based Modeling of Small-Scaled Societies", Dynamics in human and primate societies: agent-based modeling of social and spatial processes, Editors Timothy A. Kohler, George J. Gumerman, Oxford University Press US, 2000, 
"James Bennett Griffin", Biographical Memoirs, Volume 90, National Academies Press, 2009,

References

External links
"Henry T. Wright", Scientific Commons

American anthropologists
University of Michigan faculty
University of Michigan alumni
University of Chicago alumni
MacArthur Fellows
Living people
Members of the United States National Academy of Sciences
Santa Fe Institute people
1943 births